Raya Meddine is a Lebanese American actress. She is known for her role as Sabrina Costelana Newman on The Young and the Restless. Meddine is sometimes credited as Rana Alamuddin.

Personal life
Born in New York City, Meddine has lived in several countries and speaks five languages.  She and her husband, director/writer Elie Karam currently divide their time between their homes in Los Angeles and Paris. She is a Lebanese American. Raya and her husband are the parents of two children.

Career
Raya Meddine has worked in Paris, Beirut and Los Angeles.  In February 2008, Meddine joined the cast of the American soap opera The Young and the Restless in the contract role of Sabrina Costelana Newman. A shift in story line killed off the character, and Meddine left the role of Sabrina in August 2008. In June 2009, due to the popularity of the Sabrina character, Meddine inked a deal with The Young & the Restless to appear on a recurring basis as Sabrina's "ghost".

Some of her other acting roles include Isabelle in the Lebanese box office hit Bosta (2006), and as Wanda in the short award winning film Recycling Flo (2004). She also made a guest appearance as Kayla on the NBC TV series, She Spies alongside Natasha Henstridge in 2003. In 2009, Meddine guest starred on the hit CBS series, CSI: Miami, and will appear in the upcoming film, When Worlds Collide, produced by Steven Spielberg. When Worlds Collide is in pre-production and is scheduled for release in 2010/2011.  Ms. Meddine recently appeared in a featured role in the hit summer movie "Sex and the City 2" opposite Sarah Jessica Parker.

In January 2012, Raya appeared on the pilot episode of the FOX television series, Touch, starring Kiefer Sutherland.

Social awareness
Meddine is cultural ambassador for the Levantine Cultural Center in Los Angeles.

Filmography
 2003: She Spies as Kayla (1 episode)
 2004: Baby's Momma Drama as N/A
 2004: Recycling Flo as Wanda
 2005: Bosta as Isabelle
 2008: The Young and the Restless as Sabrina Costelana Newman (Role: February 28-August 4, 2008, September 24, 2008, June 2, 2009 to June 5, 2009, December 23, 2010
 2008: CSI: Miami as Kate Hawkes (1 episode)
 2010: Rizzoli & Isles as Claire (1 episode)
 2010: Sex and the City 2 as Annesha
 2012: Touch as Mrs. Kosta

References

External links

Actresses from New York City
American film actresses
American soap opera actresses
American television actresses
American people of Lebanese descent
Living people
People from Greater Los Angeles
Year of birth missing (living people)
21st-century American women